Cinchona officinalis  is a South American tree in the family Rubiaceae. It is native to wet montane forests in Colombia, Ecuador, Peru and Bolivia, between 1600–2700 meters above sea level.

Description
Cinchona officinalis is a shrub or tree with rugose bark and branchlets covered in minute hairs. Stipules lanceolate or oblong, acute or obtuse, glabrous. Inflorescences in terminal panicles, many-flowered; hypanthium with short coarse hairs; reddish calyx, glabrous or nearly so, with triangular lobes; pink or red corolla, sericeous, the lobes ovate, acute, the corolla tube being about 1 cm. long. Fruit is an oblong capsule, 1.5–2 cm. long, almost glabrous.

Vernacular names
English: quinine, red cinchona, cinchona bark, Jesuit’s bark, loxa bark, Jesuit’s powder, countess powder, Peruvian bark.

Spanish: quina, cascarilla, cargua cargua, corteza coja.

French: quinquina, écorce du Pérou.

Uses
Cinchona officinalis is a medicinal plant, one of several Cinchona species used for the production of quinine, which is an anti-fever agent. It is especially useful in the prevention and treatment of malaria. Other alkaloids that are extracted from this tree include cinchonine, cinchonidine and quinidine.

References

External links

Tropical Plants Database: Cinchona officinalis

officinalis
Medicinal plants of South America
Quinine
Plants described in 1753
Trees of Peru
Trees of Ecuador
Trees of Colombia
Trees of Bolivia
Taxa named by Carl Linnaeus